Brownsville Station is an American rock band from Michigan popular in the 1970s. Original members included Cub Koda (guitarist/vocalist), Mike Lutz (guitarist/vocalist), T.J. Cronley (drummer), and Tony Driggins (bassist/vocals). Later members included Henry "H-Bomb" Weck (drummer) and Bruce Nazarian (guitarist/vocalist).

They are primarily remembered for the top-10 hit single "Smokin' in the Boys Room" (1973).

History

Early history
Brownsville Station was formed in Ann Arbor, Michigan,  in 1969.  Brownsville Station's early albums included song covers from bands which had inspired them.  In 1970, they released their debut studio album, No BS, on a Warners Bros. label.  Their biggest hit, "Smokin' in the Boys Room", written by Michael Lutz & Cub Koda, from their 1973 album Yeah!, reached No. 3 on U.S. Billboard Hot 100 chart and No. 27 in the UK Singles Chart. The track sold over two million copies and was awarded a gold disc status by the RIAA on 15 January 1974.

Later history
In 1977, Brownsville Station recorded "Martian Boogie", one of their seven singles to chart on the Hot 100. The song was also a feature on Dr. Demento's radio show. "(Lady) Put The Light On", their penultimate single, also charted in the Hot 100, at 46.

After drummer Cronley left the band, Van Wert, Ohio, native Henry "H-Bomb" Weck was called on to fill the position left by Cronley.

The band's second-highest Billboard charting single was "Kings of the Party" which topped out at No. 31 in 1974.

Original members of Brownsville Station disbanded in 1979 and their final studio album together, Air Special, was released by Epic in 1978.

Cub Koda was the most visible Brownsville Station member after their break up. He recorded a number of solo albums and toured with his own group The Points as well as blues man Hound Dog Taylor's backing band The Houserockers. His solo repertoire included the albums Cub Koda and the Points, It's the Blues, Box Lunch and the career spanning compilation Welcome to My Job. In addition, Koda, a rabid collector of rockabilly, doo wop and blues, wrote liner notes for numerous retro releases (including Jimmy Reed, Freddy Cannon and The Kingsmen) and countless music reviews for the All Music Guide series of books and website. He also wrote a popular column ("The Vinyl Junkie") for Goldmine magazine and co-authored the book Blues For Dummies. In addition, he hosted The Cub Koda Crazy Show for Massachusetts radio station WCGY during a period in the early 80s. Koda died of kidney disease in July 2000 at the age of 51.

Mike Lutz went on to produce many bands, including Ted Nugent's Spirit of the Wild album, and toured in the 1990s with Nugent. Lutz still resides in Ann Arbor, teaches guitar and bass at a local music store called Oz's Music, writes and produces many acts.

While still in Brownsville Station, Henry Weck engineered and co-produced the Strikes album for Blackfoot, which produced two hit singles, "Highway Song" and "Train Train" (on which Koda played harmonica). Weck continues to record and produce in Memphis, in Ann Arbor at Lutz's Tazmania Studios and is the co-driving force of the re-united Brownsville Station.

After T. J. Cronley left Brownsville Station, he spent a career in the U.S. Marine Corps as a Marine aviator, and retired as a lieutenant colonel in 1992.  He is currently a pilot for FedEx and resides in Yuma, Arizona.  He is also an artist.

Bruce Nazarian went on to produce, engineer and perform with his band "The Automatix", who released their debut LP on MCA in 1983. He was the CEO of Digital Media Consulting Group and ran a popular digital media website "TheDigitalGuy.com". Nazarian also produced and hosted The Digital Guy radio show in addition to being a music producer, concert impresario and artist manager. His last band, "The Brotherhood" is slated to release their debut CD "(It's) All About The Groove" in early 2016. Nazarian died in October 2015.

In 2008, Brownsville Station was inducted into the Michigan Rock and Roll Legends Hall of Fame.

Through the band's early days, Weck captured over 500 hours of Brownsville demos, rehearsals, live shows and even some special events. In 2012, Lutz and Weck began sorting through the recordings in Lutz's Tazmania Studio. The result is Still Smokin', featuring new songs and updated versions of the band's "My Friend Jack" and “Smokin’ In The Boys Room”.

Augmented by new players Billy Craig, Arlen Viecelli and Brad Johnson, Brownsville Station returned to the road in 2013.

In popular culture 
In the television series King of the Hill, Brownsville Station is part of the subplot of "Hank Fixes Everything" (Season 10, Episode 10), reuniting for the "Still Smokin' in the Boys Room" tour (incidentally, when the band reunited for real in 2012, their subsequent album would be titled Still Smokin'''). The band is a favorite of the character Lucky (voiced by Tom Petty), who camps outside the ticket booth to purchase seats for prime viewing of Mike Lutz playing guitar.

Influences
Brownsville Station's early influences included Chuck Berry, Bo Diddley, Jerry Lee Lewis, and other 1950s rock and roll musicians.  Koda's onstage antics influenced many rockers including Peter Wolf and Alice Cooper.

Band members
 Mike Lutz           (1969–1979, 2012–present) - guitar, lead vocals, bass, keyboards
 Henry "H Bomb" Weck (1972–1979, 2012–present) - drums, vocals 
 Billy Craig         (2012–present) - guitar, vocals
 Arlen Viecelli      (2013–present) - guitar, vocals
 Brad Johnson        (2013–present) - bass, vocals

Former members
 Cub Koda (1969–1979; died 2000) - guitar, lead vocals, harmonica
 T.J. Cronley (1969–1971) - drums
 Tony Driggins (1969–1972) - bass, vocals
 Bruce Nazarian (1975–1979; died 2015) - guitar, lead vocals, keyboards, bass
 Andy Patalan (2012–2013) - guitar, vocals

Timeline

Discography
Albums
{| class="wikitable"
|-
! Year
! Album
!US
|-
| 1970
| No BS| style="text-align:center;"| —
|-
| 1972
| A Night on the Town| style="text-align:center;"| 191
|-
| 1973
| Yeah!| style="text-align:center;"| 98
|-
| 1974
| School Punks| style="text-align:center;"| 170
|-
| 1975
| Motor City Connection| style="text-align:center;"| 204
|-
| 1977
| Brownsville Station| style="text-align:center;"| —
|-
| 1978
| Air Special| style="text-align:center;"| —
|-
| 1995
| Seeds| style="text-align:center;"| —
|-
| 2012
| Still Smokin'| style="text-align:center;"| —
|}

Compilations
 1993: Smokin' In the Boys Room: The Best of Brownsville Station 2003: Smokin' In the Boys Room and Other Hits 2005: Smokin' In the Boys Room 2006: Rhino Hi-Five: Brownsville Station''

Singles

References

External links
 
 brownsville station | Unofficial Site
 

1969 establishments in Michigan
Big Tree Records artists
Hard rock musical groups from Michigan
Music of Ann Arbor, Michigan
Musical groups from Michigan
Musical groups established in 1969
Musical groups disestablished in 1979
Musical groups reestablished in 2012
Private Stock Records artists